Torotoro was a Moriori resident of Kaingaroa in the Chatham Islands who was killed in a skirmish with Lieutenant Broughton's men of HMS Chatham (for which the island group was subsequently named for) over a dispute concerning his fishing gear on 29 November 1791.  A memorial to Torotoro is above the beach at Kaingaroa.

References

Moriori people